A Dance to the Music of Time is a 12-volume roman-fleuve by English writer Anthony Powell, published between 1951 and 1975 to critical acclaim. The story is an often comic examination of movements and manners, power and passivity in English political, cultural and military life in the mid-20th century. The books were inspired by the painting of the same name by French artist Nicolas Poussin.

The sequence is narrated by Nicholas Jenkins. At the beginning of the first volume, Jenkins falls into a reverie while watching snow descending on a coal brazier. This reminds him of "the ancient world—legionaries ... mountain altars ... centaurs ..." These classical projections introduce the account of his schooldays, which opens A Question of Upbringing.

Over the course of the following volumes, he recalls the people he met over the previous half a century and the events, often small, that reveal their characters. Jenkins's personality is unfolded slowly, and often elliptically, over the course of the novels.

Poetry in the sequence has been explicated by Bernard Stacey who provides provenance and the poet as well as facts surrounding its use. 

Time magazine included the novel in its list of the 100 best English-language novels from 1923 to 2005. The editors of Modern Library ranked the work as 43rd-greatest English-language novel of the 20th century. The BBC ranked the novel 36th on its list of the 100 greatest British novels.

Inspiration

Jenkins reflects on the Poussin painting in the first two pages of A Question of Upbringing:

These classical projections, and something from the fire, suddenly suggested Poussin's scene in which the Seasons, hand in hand and facing outward, tread in rhythm to the notes of the lyre that the winged and naked greybeard plays. The image of Time brought thoughts of mortality: of human beings, facing outward like the Seasons, moving hand in hand in intricate measure, stepping slowly, methodically sometimes a trifle awkwardly, in evolutions that take recognisable shape: or breaking into seemingly meaningless gyrations, while partners disappear only to reappear again, once more giving pattern to the spectacle: unable to control the melody, unable, perhaps, to control the steps of the dance.

Poussin's painting is housed at the Wallace Collection in London.

Analysis
 Powell's official biographer, Hilary Spurling, has published Invitation to the Dance – a Handbook to Anthony Powell's A Dance to the Music of Time. This annotates, in dictionary form, the characters, events, art, music, and other references. She has also calculated the timeline employed by the author: this is used in the synopses linked from the novels below.
 The various aspects of the novel-sequence are also analysed in An Index to 'A Dance to the Music of Time by B. J. Moule.

The novels

Published dates are those of the first UK publication. The narrative is rarely specific about the years in which events take place. Those below are suggested by Hilary Spurling in Invitation to the Dance – a Handbook to Anthony Powell's A Dance to the Music of Time.

Principal characters

Adaptations
The cycle was adapted by Frederick Bradnum as a Classic Serial on BBC Radio 4.
In order to fit the material in, it was broadcast as four separate serials each based on a set of three books: the first three serials had six episodes, the last eight. The series were broadcast between 1979 and 1982. The cycle was adapted again as a six-part Classic Serial on BBC Radio 4 from 6 April to 11 May 2008, directed by John Taylor. The cycle was adapted as a four-part TV series A Dance to the Music of Time by Anthony Powell and Hugh Whitemore for Channel 4 in 1997, directed by Christopher Morahan and Alvin Rakoff.

References

External links
 A synopsis of each novel from Anthony Powell Society
 "Models for Characters in Anthony Powell's A Dance to the Music of Time"
 Poussin's painting

 
Dance to the Music of Time, A
Dance to the Music of Time, A
Modernist novels